The Iglesia Ni Cristo Locale of Punta is a chapel of the Philippine-based Christian religion, the Iglesia ni Cristo. Located at Punta, Santa Ana, Manila, it was completed on 1989 in commemoration of the 75th anniversary of the church to replace the old chapel (now a museum) meters away from the current chapel, the congregation was the first locale of the church established in 1914. It was designed by architect, Carlos A. Santos-Viola in collaboration with the Iglesia ni Cristo Construction and Engineering Department.

See also
 Iglesia ni Cristo Museum (Santa Ana, Manila)

References

External links

Buildings and structures in Santa Ana, Manila
Churches in Manila
Punta
Churches completed in 1989
20th-century religious buildings and structures in the Philippines